Broughton is a village in Hamilton County, Illinois, United States. The population was 194 at the 2010 census. It is part of the Mount Vernon Micropolitan Statistical Area.

The village was founded in the 1720s as Saint Philippe du Grand Marais (called "St. Philippe") by French coureurs de bois. In the early 19th century, it was known as "Rectorville" for nearby Rector Creek, which had been named for federal land surveyor John Rector.

Geography
Illinois Route 142 passes through the village, leading north-northwest  to McLeansboro, the county seat, and south  to Eldorado.

Earthquake of 1968
Broughton was the closest village to the epicenter of the 1968 Illinois earthquake (at 37°57′00″ N, 88°28′48″ W), one of the most widely noticed tremors in United States history because it was felt in large populated areas like St. Louis and Chicago.

Demographics

As of the census of 2000, there were 193 people, 82 households, and 56 families residing in the village. The racial makeup of the village was 99.48% White and 0.52% Asian. Hispanic or Latino of any race were 0.52% of the population.

There were 82 households, out of which 30.5% had children under the age of 18 living with them, 52.4% were married couples living together, 12.2% had a female householder with no husband present, and 31.7% were non-families. 30.5% of all households were made up of individuals, and 19.5% had someone living alone who was 65 years of age or older.  The average household size was 2.35 and the average family size was 2.91.

In the village, the population was spread out, with 26.9% under the age of 18, 7.3% from 18 to 24, 21.2% from 25 to 44, 23.8% from 45 to 64, and 20.7% who were 65 years of age or older.  The median age was 40 years. For every 100 females, there were 82.1 males.  For every 100 females age 18 and over, there were 83.1 males.

The median income for a household in the village was $19,500, and the median income for a family was $21,250. Males had a median income of $27,250 versus $16,875 for females. The per capita income for the village was $11,926.  About 31.0% of families and 27.2% of the population were below the poverty line, including 38.6% of those under the age of eighteen and 16.2% of those 65 or over.

References

External links
Hamilton County Historical Society

Villages in Hamilton County, Illinois
Villages in Illinois
Mount Vernon, Illinois micropolitan area
Populated places established in the 1720s
1720s establishments in New France